Singularia solisi is a moth of the family Pterophoridae. It is found in El Salvador.

The wingspan is about 32 mm. The head is scaled and the face is pale grey-brown. The antennae are dark brown with some pale brown scales. The thorax is dark brown with a double central and a lateral white longitudinal line. The forewings are pale to dark chocolate brown, interrupted by ferruginous parts. The hindwings are ferruginous-brown. Adults have been recorded in August.

Etymology
The species is named after Mrs. Alma Solis of the National Museum of Natural History, Department of Entomology.

References

Moths described in 1994
Pterophorini
Endemic fauna of El Salvador
Moths of Central America